Rear Admiral Simon Henley FRAeS (born 1 March 1957) is a former Royal Navy officer, and a former President of the Royal Aeronautical Society.

Early life
He attended Collyer’s Grammar School (since 1976 The College of Richard Collyer from 1969–75, a sixth form college) in West Sussex, studying maths, physics and chemistry. He gained a BSc degree in mechanical engineering at the Royal Naval Engineering College (RNEC) in Plymouth in 1979.

Career

Royal Navy
Henley worked for 32 years in the Royal Navy as an engineering officer until 2007. He was Project Director for four years of the UK part of the Joint Strike Fighter program.

Rolls-Royce
Henley joined Rolls-Royce in July 2008. He became chief executive of Europrop International in December 2010, which builds the Europrop TP400 for the Airbus A400M Atlas.

Henley served as President of the Royal Aeronautical Society from 2018 to 2019.

References

External links
 RAeS

1957 births
Living people
British mechanical engineers
Fellows of the Royal Aeronautical Society
People educated at The College of Richard Collyer
People from Horsham
Rolls-Royce people
Royal Navy rear admirals